RFdump is a software created by Lukas Grunwald and Christian Bottger for security auditing RFID tags. It is periodically updated to support emerging RFID standards such as e-passport and Mifare encryption that are currently found on many pay as you go systems.

RFDump is a back-end GPL tool to directly inter-operate with any RFID reader to make the contents stored on RFID tags accessible. The tool reads an RFID tag's meta information: tag ID, tag type, manufacturer etc. The user data of a tag can be displayed and modified using either a hex or an ASCII editor. The cookie feature demonstrates how simple it is to abuse RFID technology, such as company's using it to spy on consumers. RFDump works with the ACG Multi-Tag Reader or similar card reader hardware.

RFDump features (Gtk application):

 Runs on Linux, Windows
 Supports ACGs PCMCIA/CF Multi-Tag Readers
 Decodes the tag type, tag ID and manufacturer
 Displays tag memory in hex and ASCII encoding
 Allows to write memory using hex or ASCII editor
 Full ISO/IEC 14443 type A/B support
 Support for Mifare sector keys
 Cookie feature using arbitrary cookie ID and automatically incrementing counter
 Brute-force cracking of access control cards (sector keys)
 Audit of encrypted RFID tags check for default shipping keys
 Save and restore of Mifare cards including sector keys
 Multi baudrate reader support; RFDump can set baud rate
 Scan option
 Configuration menus

Supported Tag Types:

 ISO/IEC 15693: Tag-it ISO, My-d, I-Code SLI, LRI512, TempSense
 ISO/IEC 14443 type A: Mifare Standard(1,2), Mifare UltraLight(1,2)
 ISO/IEC 14443 type B: SR176(1,2)
 Tag-it
 I-Code
 EM4002
 EM4005
 EM4050
 HITAG1
 HITAG2
 Q5
 TIRIS

References
MudSplatter, Official site of RFDUMP. Mar 29, 2009
David Reid, ePassports 'at risk' from cloning. BBC Online, Dec 15, 2006

Biometrics
Software that uses GTK